Tuli is a Khatri sub-caste in India.

References

Indian surnames
Hindu surnames
Surnames of Indian origin
Punjabi tribes
Punjabi-language surnames
Khatri clans
Khatri surnames